Shout Out Out Out Out was a Canadian dance-punk/electro group from Edmonton, Alberta. The band's lineup is unusual in that it includes multiple drummers and bassists, as well as vintage synthesizer equipment.

History
Shout Out Out Out Out was formed in 2004. The band's debut album Not Saying/Just Saying, released in 2006, garnered significant airplay on Canadian campus radio and on CBC Radio 3. The album debuted at No. 11 on Canada's national campus radio chart, !earshot, in August 2006, and moved up to No. 5 in the September chart.

In February 2007, Not Saying/Just Saying was nominated for the Juno Award for Alternative Album of the Year, but lost to City and Colour's Sometimes.

In 2008, the band released a split single with San Serac, "Friends"/"In the End It's Your Friends".

Their second album, Reintegration Time, was released on March 3, 2009. That year the band performed at the 2009 Virgin Festival in Baltimore.

The band's third album, Spanish Moss and Total Loss was released on July 17, 2012.

The song Bad Choices from the Reintegration Time album can be played at the player character's apartment in the Citadel DLC for the 2012 video game Mass Effect 3.

After July 2014, the band was in hiatus for three years.

Band members
Band members Gravy and Lyle Bell are also associated with the band Whitey Houston, while Nik Kozub was formerly a bandmate of Luke Doucet in Veal. Lyle Bell is also involved with punk marching band The Wet Secrets. Kozub and Jason Troock are the heads of the band's label, Nrmls Wlcm Records.

Kozub has also released solo material under the name Nik 7, and remixes for other artists as The Paronomasiac.

Discography

Albums
 Not Saying/Just Saying (2006)
 Reintegration Time (2009)
 Spanish Moss and Total Loss (2012)

EPs
 Nobody Calls Me Unless They Want Something (2005)
 Dude You Feel Electrical (2006)
 Friends/In the End It's Your Friends (2008, split with San Serac)

References

External links
Shout Out Out Out Out official website
Nrmls Wlcm Records 

Musical groups established in 2005
Musical groups from Edmonton
Canadian house music groups
Dance-punk musical groups
2005 establishments in Alberta